Trouble with Eve is a low budget 1960 British comedy film directed by Francis Searle and starring Hy Hazell, Sally Smith, 
Robert Urquhart and Garry Marsh. It was based on the play Widows are Dangerous by June Garland. It was shot at Walton Studios. The film was released in the U.S. in 1964 as In Trouble With Eve.

Premise
In the sleepy English village of Warlock, Louise Kingston (Hy Hazell) converts her cottage into "The Willow Tree", a commercial tearoom. However, scandal ensues when the local inspector gets caught with his pants down, and the tea room is rumoured to be a brothel.

Cast
 Hy Hazell as Louise Kingston
 Robert Urquhart as Bryan Maitland
 Sally Smith as Eve Kingston
 Garry Marsh as Roland Axbridge
 Vera Day as Daisy Freeman
 Grace Denbigh Russell as Mrs Mordant
 Brenda Hogan as Angie Kingston Rigby
 Denis Shaw as George Rigby
 Iris Vandeleur as Mrs Biddle
 Frank Atkinson as Cabdriver
 David Graham as Car Driver
 Tony Quinn as Bellchambers
 Bruce Seton as Colonel Digby-Phillpotts
 Kim Shelley as Mrs Digby-Phillpotts
 Bill Shine as Artist

Critical reception
TV Guide called the film "a barely average British comedy."

References

External links

1960 films
1960 comedy films
Films directed by Francis Searle
British comedy films
Films shot at Nettlefold Studios
Butcher's Film Service films
1960s English-language films
1960s British films